1st class Active State Councillor of the Russian Federation is the highest federal state civilian service rank of Russia. The following list is a list of all persons who was promoted to this rank during the period 1995–1999:

 Nikolai Yegorov
 Viktor Ilyushin
 Yuri Baturin
 Anatoly Korabelshchikov
 Mikhail Krasnov
 Alexander Livshits
 Dmitry Ryurikov
 Georgy Satarov
 Lev Sukhanov
 Boris Kuzyk
 Valery Semenchenko
 Vladimir Shevchenko
 Sergey Medvedev
 Sergey Krasavchenko
 Vladimir Antipov
 Valeryan Viktorov
 Ruslan Orekhov
 Anatoly Semyonov
 Igor Agarkov
 Andrey Busygin
 Andrey Voykov
 Vadim Pechenev
 Vyacheslav Romanov
 Igor Rybakov
 Larisa Brychyova
 Anatoly Ivanov
 Vyacheslav Ivanov
 Sergey Kudravets
 Andrey Loginov
 Alexander Maslov
 Mikhail Mironov
 Alexander Olefirenko
 Sergey Samoylov
 Yury Solodukhin
 Anatoly Volkov
 Vasily Frolov
 Viktor Petrushkin
 Valery Platonov
 Igor Sorokin
 Yury Shcherbakov
 Vladimir Zolotarev
 Valery Manilov
 Vladimir Rubanov
 Alexander Troshin
 Pavel Borodin
 Vladimir Kozelko
 Alexander Nikitin
 Vladimir Balduev
 Alexander Lyulkin
 Sergey Mironov
 Viktor Savchenko
 Oleg Stepanov
 Svetlana Filonenko
 Alexander Kotenkov
 Mikhail Mityukov
 Anatoly Sliva
 Maksim Boyko
 Alexander Kazakov
 Alexei Kudrin
 Evgeny Savostyanov
 Anatoly Chubais
 Yury Yarov
 Sergey Shakhray
 Sergey Ignatyev
 Sergey Yastrzhembsky
 Vyacheslav Vasyagin
 Sergey Volzhin
 Alexey Gromov
 Sergey Matsko
 Nina Sivova
 Anton Fedorov
 Valery Chernov
 Yury Shustitsky
 Anatoly Zelinsky
 Valentin Yumashev
 Vladimir Putin
 Anatoly Golovatyy
 Eduard Esterlein
 Viktor Nagaytsev
 Nikolay Troshkin
 Pavel Averin
 Viktor Elchev
 Nikolay Lyakh
 Boris Berezovsky
 Yury Deryabin
 Nikolay Mikhaylov
 Vyacheslav Pakharev
 Vladimir Panfilov
 Vladimir Nikitov
 Roman Romanov
 Mikhail Korobeynikov
 Yury Kurbatov
 Alexey Ogarev
 Boris Agapov
 Sergey Vasilyev
 Boris Pashkov
 Evgeny Arefyev
 Aleksandr Kozlov
 Valery Kurenkov
 Valery Orlov
 Alexey Prokopyev
 Andrey Sebentsov
 Gennady Petelin
 Andrey Kokoshin
 Mikhail Komissar
 Anton Danilov-Danilyan
 Mikhail Margelov
 Boris Mints
 Sergei Prikhodko
 Evgeny Ivanushkin
 Viktoriya Mitina
 Alexander Ageenkov
 Dzhakhan Pollyeva
 Sergey Zenkin
 Oleg Velyashev
 Igor Gorshkov
 Viktor Klimov
 Igor Semyonov
 Denis Molchanov
 Igor Shabdurasulov
 Vyacheslav Mikhaylov
 Sergey Shapovalov
 Andrey Yanik
 Pyotr Deynekin
 Ivan Rybkin
 Oleg Sysuev
 Aleksandr Voloshin
 Dmitry Yakushkin
 Albert Ageev
 Mstislav Afanasyev
 Robert Markaryan
 Aleksandr Torshin
 Armen Medvedev
 Ivan Materov
 Arkady Samokhvalov
 Andrey Svinarenko
 Alexey Gordeyev
 Vladimir Shcherbak
 Ivan Gorbachev
 Igor Mitrofanov
 Gennady Kozlov
 Gennady Tereshchenko
 Mikhail Kasyanov
 Alexander Braverman
 Yury Medvedev
 Alexander Lugovets
 Anatoly Nasonov
 Yuri Vorobyov
 Nikolay Mikheev
 Boris Yatskevich
 Igor Chekmezov
 Robert Tsivilev
 Ivan Leshkevich
 Gennady Onishchenko
 Vladimir Makarov
 Evgeny Lisov
 Andrey Shtorkh
 Yury Vishnevsky
 Oleg Vyugin
 Sergey Karmanov
 Vyacheslav Khizhnyakov
 Alexander Suvorov
 Vladimir Kalamanov
 Vitaly Dolgov
 Valery Pogrebnoy
 Sergey Semakov
 Nikolay Khavansky
 Alexander Bedritsky
 Valentina Tereshkova
 Vladimir Kozlov
 Vladimir Kozhin
 Viktor Denikin
 Galina Kupriyanova
 Valery Shubin

See also
 State civilian and municipal service ranks in Russian Federation

References

Federal state civilian service ranks in the Russian Federation